Harju is a quarter of Helsinki, Finland. It is located northeast from the city centre, part of Alppiharju neighbourhood, between the quarters of Alppila, Torkkelinmäki, Linjat and neighbourhoods Sörnäinen and Vallila. Harju has a population of 7,237 (as of 1 January 2005) and an area of 0.27 km².

Harju has the highest population density per km² in Finland, along with the neighboring Torkkelinmäki quarter. Apartments in Harju are usually very small, single-person flats. Harju also contains dozens of pubs, fast-food restaurants and Thai massage parlors, despite its very small size by area.

References

External links

Quarters of Helsinki